Grand Ayatollah Kadhim Husayni al-Haeri (born 1938) is a prominent Twelver Shi'a Marja. He has studied in seminars of Najaf, Iraq under Grand Ayatollah Sadeq al-Sadr. Haeri was born in Karbala, Iraq. He was a top leader of the Al-Da'wa Party in Iraq. His involvement in the party led to his exile in the 1970s, later he moved to Iran, where he remains to this day in the city of Qom.

Relationship with Muqtada Al-Sadr
Al-Haeri is considered the successor to Mohammad Baqir al-Sadr, but since al-Haeri has resided in Iran since the 1970s he has not been able to fully take on this position. Despite his exile, he serves as the advisor to the younger al-Sadr on matters of jurisprudence. Thus, al-Haeri is a key source of legitimacy for Al-Sadr. Al-Sadr had previously stated that he would have worked with Ayatollah Mohammed Baqir al-Hakim if Ayatollah al-Haeri had ordered it. Recently, Muqtada al-Sadr and Abdul-Aziz al-Hakim signed a pact to end all potential hostilities between the two camps.

Al-Haeri has also issued fatwas against the U.S.-led occupation of Iraq, but he publicly criticized Muqtada al-Sadr for potential weakening against the Shi'a establishment and its hierarchy in Najaf under the guise of anti-Americanism in April 2004 while taking Haeri's name.

Resignation 
On August 29, 2022, al-Haeri announced his resignation from the position of Marja, due to old age and illness. This was described as the first time in history a Marja has ever resigned from his position. However, this is wrong as instances of Maraji resigning in the past exists, like that of Sheikh Muhammad Baqir "Al Waheed" Al Behbahani who, according to Sheikh Osama Aal e Bilal Najafi, resigned and made his student, Sayyid Ali Al Tabatabaei the Marja.

See also

 List of current Maraji
 Ayatollah
 Marja'

References

External links
 Official Website 
 2nd Official Website

Iranian ayatollahs
Iraqi ayatollahs
Iraqi Shia Muslims
Living people
1938 births
Islamic Dawa Party